Melika Motevalli Taher (born 6 May 1998), known as Melika Motevalli, is an Iranian footballer who plays as a defender for Kowsar Women Football League club Shahrdari Sirjan and the senior Iran women's national team.

International goals
Scores and results list Iran's goal tally first.

References 

1998 births
Living people
Iranian women's footballers
Iran women's international footballers
Women's association football defenders
People from Babol
Sportspeople from Mazandaran province
21st-century Iranian women